Polytremis zina is a diurnal species of Lepidoptera belonging to the genus Polytremis that can be found throughout east Asia.It was first described by William Harry Evans in 1932.
Polytremis zina contains the following subspecies:
 Zinaida zina asahinai
 Zinaida zina taiwana

References

Butterflies described in 1932
Hesperiinae